Jarrod Michael Jones (born May 27, 1990) is an American-born naturalized Hungarian professional basketball player who last played for the Joventut Badalona of the Spanish Liga ACB.

College career
During the four years he played in NCAA for Ball State University, Jarrod Jones was named to the All Mac team during the 2010–11 season. He averaged 13 points and 8 rebounds per game.

Professional career
Jones played in the NBA Summer League with Sacramento Kings for the 2012–13 season.

Jones signed a contract in Europe with BC Budivelnyk and later with two clubs in Hungary (Alba Fehérvár and Atomerőmű SE), where he played for two seasons.

He started the 2015–16 season with JA Vichy in the French LNB Pro B and then returned in Hungary with Szolnoki Olaj KK, where he won the championship.

On July 3, 2016, Jones signed a contract with the Italian basketball team Victoria Libertas Pesaro, and he will take part to the 2016–17 LBA season. On May 8, 2017, he signed with Guizhou of China for the 2017 NBL season.

On August 2, 2017, Jones signed with Turkish club Pınar Karşıyaka for the 2017–18 season. Jones averaged 17 points and 6.1 rebounds per game in the Turkish League. He inked a deal with French team AS Monaco Basket on August 20, 2018.

On July 28, 2019, he has signed a contract with Turkish Darüşşafaka of the Turkish Basketbol Süper Ligi. 

On September 25, 2020, Jones signed a contract with the Slovenian team Cedevita Olimpija.  He averaged 11.7 points, 5.2 rebounds, and 1.6 assists per game. 

On December 24, 2021, Jones signed with the Zhejiang Guangsha Lions of the Chinese Basketball Association.

On October 6, 2022, Jones signed a one month contract with Spanish team Joventut Badalona.

Career statistics

FIBA Champions League

|-
| style="text-align:left;" | 2017–18
| style="text-align:left;" | Karsiyaka
| 18 || 33.7 || .529 || .400 || .794 || 6.6 || 2.2 || 0.8 || 0.7 || 18.8
|}

References

External links
Jarrod Jones at LNB.fr
Jarrod Jones at Legabasket.it
Jarrod Jones at Sports-reference.com (NCAA)

1990 births
Living people
Alba Fehérvár players
ABA League players
American emigrants to Hungary
American expatriate basketball people in China
American expatriate basketball people in France
American expatriate basketball people in Hungary
American expatriate basketball people in Italy
American expatriate basketball people in Monaco
American expatriate basketball people in Slovenia
American expatriate basketball people in Spain
American expatriate basketball people in Turkey
American expatriate basketball people in Ukraine
American men's basketball players
AS Monaco Basket players
Atomerőmű SE players
Ball State Cardinals men's basketball players
Basketball players from Indiana
BC Kyiv players
Darüşşafaka Basketbol players
Hungarian men's basketball players
Hungarian expatriate basketball people in France
Hungarian expatriates in Monaco
Hungarian expatriate basketball people in Turkey
JA Vichy players
Joventut Badalona players
Karşıyaka basketball players
KK Cedevita Olimpija players
Lega Basket Serie A players
Liga ACB players
People from Michigan City, Indiana
Sportspeople from the Chicago metropolitan area
Szolnoki Olaj KK players
Victoria Libertas Pallacanestro players
Power forwards (basketball)
Zhejiang Lions players